Rockdale Independent School District is a public school district based in Rockdale, Texas (USA).

In 2011, the school district was rated "academically acceptable" by the Texas Education Agency.

Schools
Rockdale High School (grades 9-12)
1984-85 National Blue Ribbon School
Rockdale Junior High (grades 6-8)
Rockdale Intermediate School (grades 2-5)
Rockdale Elementary (grades PK-1)

Athletics
The Rockdale Tigers participate in many sports. Rockdale High School's principal rival are the Cameron Yoemen, as the schools are about 15 minutes apart, separated by the Little River. The Rockdale Tigers and Cameron Yoemen play in the "Battle of the Bell" every year.

Rockdale High School won state football championships in 1976 and in 2017.

References

External links
Rockdale ISD

School districts in Milam County, Texas